The Relatives are a Gospel, funk and soul band. They were formed in 1970 by brothers Reverend Gean West and Reverend Tommie West. Having opened for bands such as Black Joe Lewis & the Honeybears and Charles Bradley, The Relatives are best known for their musical resurrection, having reunited after thirty years of inactivity to produce two critically acclaimed albums. They have featured on NPR, The New York Times and had their single "Don't Let Me Fall" reissued by Daptone Records in 2014.

History 
A group that fuses gospel, funk, and psychedelic soul, the Relatives were formed in 1970, by Texas natives Reverend Gean West and Reverend Tommie West. After releasing three singles and opening for bands such as The Staple Singers and The Five Blind Boys of Mississippi, the Relatives broke up in 1980 due to lack of interest in their releases. Writing in The New York Times, James C. McKinley Jr. surmised that during their initial run "Their sound was too close to R&B for the church, too laden with gospel lyrics for R&B radio."

The Relatives were brought back together after producer Noel Waggener was handed a cracked copy of their 1971 EP "Don't Let Me Fall" by a friend's mother who had found it at a thrift shop. After Waggener and his partner tracked down Gean West to a church in Dallas, The Relatives reunited to play a concert in 2009 at The Continental Club in Austin, Texas. They released a compilation album titled Don't Let Me Fall, under Waggener's label Heavy Light Records in 2009.

They featured on the Black Joe Lewis & the Honeybears song "You Been Lyin", which was included on their 2011 album Scandalous.

The Relatives signed to the label Yep Roc Records in 2010 and recorded their first album, The Electric Word, with Spoon's Jim Eno as producer and Zach Ernst, formerly of Black Joe Lewis & the Honeybears, on guitar. The album was widely acclaimed with favorable reviews from The Observer, The Independent The Austin Chronicle and AllMusic. The album garnered national attention with NPR and The New York Times both running features on the band's reunion.

The Relative's second album, Goodbye World, would also be Gean West's last. Despite having been in a coma only a few weeks prior to recording, West insisted that God had sent him back to finish the album. He died on February 3, 2015, a week and a half after finishing the final recording. Goodbye World was released on April 29, 2016.

The Relatives continue to perform live shows despite the deaths of both West and Tony Corbitt, who along with Tyron Edwards was recruited at the start of The Relatives' comeback to replace former members. They opened for Charley Crockett in 2019.

Discography

Studio albums 
 2013 - The Electric Word - Yep Roc Records
 2016 - Goodbye World - Luv N' Haight

EPs 
 1971 - "Speak to Me" / "Walking On" - Jewell Records
 1971 - "Don't Let Me Fall" / "Rap On" - Hosanna Records
 1976 - "This World Is Moving Too Fast" / "Free at Last" - Bix international
 2013 - "Can't Feel Nothin'" / "No Man is an Island" - Luv N' Haight"

Singles 
 2013 - "Bad Trip" - Yep Roc Records
 2013 - "Things are Changing" - Yep Roc Records
 2014 - "Don't Let Me Fall" - Daptone Records,

Compilations 
 2009 - Don't Let Me Fall - Heavy Light Records

References

External links 
Transcript of NPR interview with Rev. Gean West and Rev. Tommie West at NPR

Musical groups established in 1970
American gospel musical groups
American funk musical groups
Yep Roc Records artists
1970 establishments in Texas